The VR Class Vk11 No 101 locomotive was purchased for testing on a six-mile stretch of track between Vuokatti and Sotkamo, where the use of steam locomotives had proved to be uneconomical due to low traffic. The locomotive was ordered from the Swedish act called Ab Slipmaterial of Sweden, and it was completed in 1930. The locomotive had a six-litre Wisconsin petrol-paraffin internal-combustion engine. In January 1931 the locomotive was delivered to Finland, it initially received the number Mt 101. Another very similar locomotive was ordered home in 1935. It was built by Lokomo in Finland and had an 80 hp paraffin Andros petrol-paraffin engine. It initially received the number Mt 102. In 1953 locomotive class designation was changed to Vk11, and in 1962 they were renumbered again to Tve-ko1 and Tve-ko2.
Vk11 locomotives were broadly similar to each other, but there were a number of detail differences. Both were two-axle and weighing 12 tons. Both had engines that ran on kerosene / paraffin as fuel but required gasoline / petrol to start them. Locomotives had different lengths of 5.6 m and 6.0 m.
Locomotive Vk11 No. 101 was tested on Vuokatti-Sotkamo line for four months. When the passenger rail in this case was discontinued, it was transferred to the locomotive workshop in Oulu on internal traffic. In 1935, the locomotive was placed in a shunting yard in Siuro. After that the locomotive was used at Vaasa and the workshop at Oulu as a shunter. The locomotive was withdrawn in 1962.

Numbering, Duration of Operation and Manufacturer

See also
 Finnish Railway Museum
 VR Group
 List of Finnish locomotives
 List of railway museums Worldwide
 Heritage railways
 List of heritage railways
 Restored trains
 Jokioinen Museum Railway
 History of rail transport in Finland

External links
Finnish Railway Museum
Steam Locomotives in Finland Including the Finnish Railway Museum

Gallery

References

Vk11
 Vk11
Railway locomotives introduced in 1930